The Methodist Episcopal Church of Painesville (also known as Painesville United Methodist Church) is a historic church building at 71 N. Park Place in Painesville, Ohio.

It was built in 1873 in a Gothic Revival style and added to the National Register of Historic Places in 1998.

References

External links
 Official website

Methodist churches in Ohio
Churches on the National Register of Historic Places in Ohio
Gothic Revival church buildings in Ohio
Churches completed in 1873
Churches in Lake County, Ohio
National Register of Historic Places in Lake County, Ohio